The 2015 Carpathian Trophy was the 47th edition of the Carpathian Trophy held in Cluj-Napoca, Romania between 20–21 March as a women's friendly handball tournament organised by the Romanian Handball Federation. 

The most recent winners of the World Championship (Brazil) and the most recent bronze medalists of the European Championship (Sweden) appeared in the competition.

Participants
  Romania (hosts)
  Brazil
  Germany
  Sweden

Knockout stage (place 1-4)

Bracket

Semifinals

Third place game

Final

Statistics

Final ranking

References

External links
  

 
2015
2015 in handball
2015 in Romanian sport
Sport in Cluj-Napoca
March 2015 sports events in Romania